State League 2 is a semi-professional association football league in Victoria, Australia. Sitting at level 5 of the Victorian league system, below the three NPL Victoria divisions, it forms part of the fifth tier of the overall Australian pyramid. It is the second-highest-ranked of the five State Leagues.

The league consists of two geographic divisions, North-West and South-East, comprising 12 teams each. The champions of each division are promoted to State League 1; the two bottom-placed teams in each division are replaced with the champions and runners-up of the corresponding State League 3 divisions.

The competition is administered by Football Victoria, the governing body of the sport in the state.

Clubs
The following 24 clubs from 2 conferences of 12 who are competing in the Victorian State League Division 2 during the 2023 season.

State League Division 2 North-West

State League Division 2 South-East

External links
Football Federation Victoria Official website
Football Federation Victoria Table and Results
North West Table - http://www.foxsportspulse.com/comp_info.cgi?a=LADDER&compID=394742&c=1-8746-0-0-0
South East Table -  http://www.foxsportspulse.com/comp_info.cgi?a=LADDER&compID=395441&c=1-8746-0-0-0

2
Professional sports leagues in Australia
Australia